The Lusitania Bridge is a bridge in Mérida, Spain.

History
The bridge was built over the Guadiana River in 1991 by a Spanish consortium to take the road traffic from the Romano bridge. The architect was Santiago Calatrava. The bridge takes its name from the fact that Emerita Augusta (present day Merida) was the former capital of Lusitania, an ancient Roman province.

See also
 Guadiana Roman bridge.
 Guadiana International Bridge.
 Our Lady of Help Bridge.

References

Road bridges in Spain
Bridges over the Guadiana River
Bridges by Santiago Calatrava
Bridges completed in 1991
1991 establishments in Spain
Bridges in Mérida, Spain